Vertical Forms is a Unicode block containing vertical punctuation for compatibility characters with the Chinese Standard GB 18030.

In the Unicode specification,  has a typo in its name; "BRACKET" is spelt as "BRAKCET".

History
The following Unicode-related documents record the purpose and process of defining specific characters in the Vertical Forms block:

See also 
 CJK Compatibility Forms, contains additional vertical compatibility punctuation forms.

References 

Unicode blocks